Delaroche is a surname. Notable people with the surname include:

 Christine Delaroche (born 1944), French actress and singer
 François-Étienne de La Roche (or Delaroche) (1743–1812), Swiss ichthyologist
 Hippolyte Delaroche ( Paul Delaroche, 1797–1856), French painter
 Marc Delaroche (born 1971), French footballer